Saško Kedev, also Sashko Kedev (born 6 July 1962) is a Macedonian politician and doctor of medical sciences. He is a member of the political party VMRO-DPMNE.

Personal life
Born at Štip, Kedev graduated high school in his hometown. He is a physician specialist cardiologist. From 1991 to 1993 he was a specialist at a clinic in Bethesda, USA, Assistant Professor at the Faculty of Medicine at the Ss. Cyril and Methodius University in Skopje, European intervention certified cardiologist, certified intervention cardiologist in the U.S. He was director of the clinic for cardiology from 1999 to 2003. He lives in Skopje.

On 19 May 2009, Kedev climbed Mount Everest, becoming the third Macedonian to scale the highest peak in the world.

Politics
From 2002 to 2006 he was a member of the Assembly of the Republic of Macedonia. In April 2004 he was a presidential candidate but lost in the second round against socialist Branko Crvenkovski.

References

External links
Article about the climb of Saško Kedev at Mount Everest

Members of the Macedonian Orthodox Church
Eastern Orthodox Christians from North Macedonia
1962 births
Living people
VMRO-DPMNE politicians
Summiters of Mount Everest
Macedonian mountain climbers
Politicians from Skopje
Ss. Cyril and Methodius University of Skopje alumni
Academic staff of the Ss. Cyril and Methodius University of Skopje
People from Štip
Macedonian physicians